Pondok Ranji Station (PRJ) is a railway station on the KRL Commuterline Green Line in East Ciputat, South Tangerang, Banten, Indonesia. On August 20, 2020, Minister of Transportation, Budi Karya Sumadi, attended the Groundbreaking New Image and Accessibility Improvement of Pondok Ranji Station. The inauguration is the start of the construction or renovation of Pondok Ranji station. In January 2022, the renovations have finished and Pondok Ranji station has a new shape.

This station is the easternmost train station in South Tangerang and the southeasternmost in Banten. The location of this station is strategic because it is close to the Bintaro Jaya planned city, the College of Meteorology, Climatology and Geophysics (STMKG), State Finance Polytechnic STAN (PKN STAN), and UIN Syarif Hidayatullah.

The station is located at the elevation of +25 metres above sea level.

Building and layout 

This station is one of the stations that is quite new because it was only opened in 1990 as a recommendation from the first Bintaro train crash in 1987. This station has two railway lines. Line 1 is a straight line towards Serpong, while line 2 is a straight line towards Tanah Abang.

This station has extended its platform to accommodate KRL with 10 trains per set. Currently Pondok Ranji Station already has a pedestrian tunnel, along with Sudimara Station, so that passengers no longer need to cross the tracks and are not left behind by the KRL. As soon as they enter the e-gate, passengers are immediately directed to the pedestrian tunnel.

Renovation and further development 

On August 20, 2020, the Minister of Transportation, Budi Karya Sumadi attended the Groundbreaking New Image and Accessibility Improvement of the Pondok Ranji Station. The inauguration marked the start of the construction or renovation of the Pondok Ranji station. The inauguration was attended by the Mayor of South Tangerang, Airin Rachmi Diany, also attended by the Main Director of Kereta Api Indonesia (KAI), Didiek Hartantyo, and also the Main Director of PT. Jaya Real Property (JRP) Trisna Muliadi as the manager and developer of Bintaro Jaya.

Renovations were carried out at most of the stations, by expanding the inside and outside of the station.  In addition, there is an additional motorcycle parking location at the end of the station, which was not there before. Two minimarkets are next to each other, namely Alfamart and Indomaret. The renovation was carried out as an effort to develop a more modern transportation system in South Tangerang.

In early 2022, the renovation of Pondok Ranji Station was completed. This was also marked by the inauguration directly on June 16 2022 by the Minister of Transportation, Budi Karya Sumadi, together with the Minister of State-Owned Enterprises (BUMN), Erick Thohir, which also opened new access from the Station via Bintaro Creative Village.

Services
The following is a list of train services at the Pondok Ranji Station.
KRL Commuterline

Supporting transportation

Incidents 

 On February 4, 2016, Fitri "the Spiderkid" who liked to climb buildings and towers was killed by a KRL train at Pondok Ranji Station after falling while climbing the station wall.
 On July 30, 2022, a woman was killed by a KRL train number 2030 bound for Parung Panjang near Pondok Ranji Station. The victim, who was wearing a red scarf, was then taken to Fatmawati Hospital.

Gallery

References

South Tangerang
Railway stations in Banten